Nights of Princes (French: Nuits de princes) is a 1938 French-German drama film directed by Vladimir Strizhevsky and starring Käthe von Nagy, Marina Koshetz and Jean Murat. It is based on a 1927 novel of the same title by Joseph Kessel. An earlier adaptation Nights of Princes had been made by Marcel L'Herbier in 1930.

It was shot at the Epinay Studios in Paris. The film's sets were designed by the art directors Alexandre Lochakoff and Vladimir Meingard. A separate German-language version After Midnight was also produced.

Cast
 Käthe von Nagy as Hélène
 Marina Koshetz as Marina 
 Jean Murat as Forestier
 Fernand Fabre as Fédor
 Pauline Carton as Mademoiselle Mesureux
 Pierre Alcover as Rizine
 René Lefèvre as Wassili Wronsky
 Pierre Larquey as Chouvaloff

References

Bibliography
 Goble, Alan. The Complete Index to Literary Sources in Film. Walter de Gruyter, 1999.

External links

1938 films
1938 drama films
German drama films
French drama films
Films of Nazi Germany
1930s French-language films
Films directed by Vladimir Strizhevsky
German multilingual films
Films shot at Epinay Studios
Tobis Film films
Films set in Paris
German black-and-white films
French black-and-white films
French multilingual films
1938 multilingual films
Films based on French novels
1930s French films
1930s German films